Moolapalayam is a neighborhood located in the southern side of Erode, Tamil Nadu. It is one of the major residential locality in the city.

Kasipalayam(E) Zonal(IV) office of Erode Municipal Corporation is located in Moolapalayam.

Location
The locality being mostly residential with areas like Shanthi Nagar, NGGO Nagar, LIC Nagar, Bharathi Nagar and Vaigai Nagar; it also houses a number of educational institutions and commercial places like supermarkets and two-wheeler showrooms. Due to the unavailability of space and increasing residential area, the small lands in this locality were turning into Parking places. It is located along the Avalpoondurai Road, about 5 km from Erode Central Bus Terminus and 2 km from Erode Junction railway station. Karur bypass road branches off from Palani road here. The Central Warehousing Corporation has a warehouse in this locality.

Neighborhoods
Erode Junction railway station
Erode Bus Terminus 
Solar
Avalpoondurai
Mullamparappu
Kaspapettai
Bharathi Nagar

References

Neighbourhoods in Erode